Broadway to Oz was a 2015 concert tour by Australian actor, musician and dancer Hugh Jackman. He performed Broadway and Hollywood musical numbers backed by a company of 150 musicians and dancers. The concert show was produced by Dainty Group and Robert Fox Ltd. The show started in Melbourne on 24 November 2015, touring through Sydney, Brisbane and Adelaide, before closing in Perth on 15 December, 2015.

Tour dates

Setlist for November 23 show (may not be all shows) 

Act one

Forever For You
I Won't Dance
L-O-V-E
The Way You Look Tonight
She Makes My Day
Movie medley (Luck Be A Lady, Singing In The Rain, I Got Rhythm, Steppin’ Out With My Baby, Sing Sing Sing)
Soliloquy (Carousel)
This Is Me
Les Miserables medley (Valjean's Soliloquy, I Dreamed A Dream, One Day More)

Act two

Not the Boy Next Door
Peter Allen medley (Arthur's Theme (Best That You Can Do), Don't Cry Out Loud, I Honestly Love You, Quiet Please, There's A Lady On Stage, I Go to Rio)
Tenterfield Saddler
I Happen To Like New York
On Broadway
I’ve Been Everywhere
Nomad Two Worlds – Inhibition
Nomad Two Worlds – Art Song
Somewhere Over The Rainbow
I Still Call Australia Home
Mack The Knife
Once Before I Go

References

2015 concert tours
Hugh Jackman